2022–23 Liga 3 is the seventh season of the Liga 3 under the current name and the eighth season under the current league structure, and the only amateur league football competition in Indonesia. The tournament is organized by Provincial Association of PSSI for the provincial round and PSSI central for the national round.

Teams that qualify for the last 8 of Liga 3 are entitled to promotion to 2023–24 Liga 2. Karo United was the champion in the previous season.

The tournament, along with Liga 2 was abandoned due to a combination of factors.

Team changes 
The following teams changed divisions after the 2021 season.

To Liga 3 
Relegated from 2021–22 Liga 2

 PS Mitra Kukar
 Badak Lampung
 KS Tiga Naga
 Hizbul Wathan

From Liga 3 
Promotion from 2021–22 Liga 3

 Karo United
 Putra Delta Sidoarjo
 Mataram Utama (changed name to Nusantara United)
 PSDS Deli Serdang
 Deltras
 Persikab Bandung
 Gresik United
 Persipa Pati

Rules
Here are some rules for the 2022 season:

Participating team
PSSI member clubs or PSSI member candidate clubs who have completed the registration administration requirements as a member of PSSI and have received approval at the relevant provincial PSSI annual congress.
Registration of participating clubs via the online system SIAP (Sistem Informasi dan Administrasi PSSI).
All clubs participating in Liga 3 2022 compete in the provincial round, there is no pre-national round for the participants of Liga 3 2021–2022 to reach the last 16 of the National Round.
Aspects of football development, enough time lag between one match to another.

Player
The age of the players is the birth of January 1, 2000 to December 31, 2004 and 5 senior players. 
The maximum number of registered players is 35 players.
Minimum trainer license AFC C License.
The maximum number of registered officials is 10 peoples. 
Player registration via online system SIAP (Sistem Informasi dan Administrasi PSSI).

Provincial league 

Notes:
 BOLD: Winner of each provincial league.
 The number of slots for each province will be determined by the respective Provincial Associations with the approval of the PSSI.

See also
 2022–23 Liga 1
 2022–23 Liga 2
 2022–23 Piala Indonesia

References

Liga 3 (Indonesia)
Liga 3 (Indonesia) seasons
2022 in Indonesian football
2022 in Indonesian football leagues
2022 in Indonesian sport
2022–23 in Asian third tier association football leagues